The Southern Mallee District Council is a local government area in the Murray and Mallee region of South Australia. The council offices are in Pinnaroo and Lameroo. It was established on 23 January 1997 when the District Council of Lameroo and District Council of Pinnaroo agreed to merge. Their predecessors date from 1908.

The largest towns are Lameroo and Pinnaroo; the council also includes the localities of Geranium, Karte, Parilla and Parrakie, and parts of Jabuk and Ngarkat.

Council

References

External links
Local Government Association
Council website

Local government areas of South Australia